Afgan Syahreza is an Indonesian singer and actor. This is a list of awards received by Afgan.

100% Ampuh Awards
The 100% Ampuh Awards are an awards ceremony were presented by 100% Ampuh and first established in 2013 on Global TV, to awarded for achievement artist who to be appreciated in music.

!
|-
| 2013
| Afgan
| Best Solo Singer
| 
|
|-

Anugerah MeleTOP Era
The Anugerah MeleTOP Era (formerly Anugerah Era)  are an awards to recognize local celebrities in various platforms, such as music, radio, television, film and digital in Malaysia, based on website voting and SMS. The awards ceremonies presented from 2001 to 2007 during six years of vacuum and held again in 2014.

!
|-
| 2014
| Afgan
| Best Regional Artist
| 
|
|-

Anugerah Melodi
The Anugerah Melodi (English translation: Melody Awards) was an award ceremony were presented by infotainment Melodi in Malaysia, to recognition to the local and international arts activists are certainly a great impact in the local entertainment center stage. Afgan has received one award.

!
|-
| 2016
| Afgan
| Overseas Personality Melody
| 
| 
|-

Anugerah Industri Muzik
The Anugerah Industri Muzik (English translation: Music Industry Awards), commonly known by the acronym AIM, are awards to honour the Malaysian music industry, first held in 1993. It is Malaysia's equivalent of the Grammy Awards.

!
|-
| 2013
| "Pesan Cinta"
| Best Malay Song Performance by Foreign Artist
| 
|
|-

Anugerah Musik Indonesia
The Anugerah Musik Indonesia (English translation: Indonesian Music Awards), is an annual Indonesian major music award. They have been compared to the American Grammy Awards and British Brit Awards. The award was formalized in 1997 by ASIRI (Association of Indonesia Recording Industry), PAPPRI (Association of Indonesian Singers, Songwriters and Music Record Producers), and KCI (Copyright Office of Indonesia). It is the highest music award given to outstanding artists in Indonesia. Afgan has received seven awards from 27 nominations.

!
|-
| rowspan= "3" | 2009
| Confession No.1
| Best Pop Album
| 
| rowspan= "3" | 
|-
| rowspan= "2" | "Terima Kasih Cinta"
| Best of the Best Newcomer
| 
|-
| rowspan= "2" | Best Pop Male Solo Artist
| 
|-
| rowspan= "6" | 2012
| rowspan= "5" | "Panah Asmara"
| 
| rowspan= "6" | 
|-
| Best Pop Song
| 
|-
| Best Mix Engineer
| 
|-
| Best Pop Recording Producer
| 
|-
| Best of the Best Production Work
| 
|-
| The One
| Best Recording Album Producer
| 
|-
| rowspan= "7" | 2014
| rowspan= "3" | "Jodoh Pasti Bertemu"
| Best Pop Male Solo Artist
| 
| rowspan= "7" | 
|-
| Best Pop/Urban Songwriter
| 
|-
| Best Pop/Urban Recording Producer
| 
|-
| "Pesan Cinta"
| Best R&B/Soul Production Work
| 
|-
| rowspan= "3" | L1ve to Love, Love to L1ve
| Best Pop/Urban Album
| 
|-
| Best Recording Album Producer
| 
|-
| Best of the Best Album
| 
|-
| rowspan= "4" | 2015
| "Kumohon"
| Best Pop Male Solo Artist
| 
| rowspan= "4" | 
|-
| rowspan= "3" | "Kamu Yang Kutunggu" (feat. Rossa)
| Best Pop Collaboration
| 
|-
| Best Collaboration Production Work
| 
|-
| Best of the Best Production Work
| 
|-
| rowspan= "3" | 2016
| "Kunci Hati"
| Best Pop Male Solo Artist
| 
| rowspan= "3" | 
|-
| rowspan= "2" | "Percayalah" (with Raisa)
| Best Pop Collaboration
| 
|-
| Best Collaboration Production Work
| 
|-
| rowspan= "4" | 2017
| "Jalan Terus"
| Best Pop Male Solo Artist
| 
| rowspan= "4" |
|-
| "Ku Dengannya Kau Dengan Dia"
| Best Mix Engineer
| 
|-
| rowspan= "2" | SIDES
| Best of the Best Album
| 
|-
| Best Pop Album
| 
|-

Anugerah Planet Muzik
The Anugerah Planet Muzik (Malay translation: Planet Music Awards), was an annual music awards were organized by several media companies MediaCorp, Suria, Warna 94.2FM and Ria 89.7FM, to honour for artist in 3 countries (Singapore, Malaysia and Indonesia) who to be outstanding achievement in the regional of Malay and Indonesian music industry. It was first established in 2001. Afgan has received five awards from 20 nominations.

!
|-
| rowspan= "6" | 2009
| rowspan= "2" | "Terima Kasih Cinta"
| Best Vocal Performance in a Song by a New Male Artist
| 
| rowspan= "6" | 
|-
| Best Song
| 
|-
| rowspan= "2" | Confession No.1
| Best Album
| 
|-
| Best Male Artist
| 
|-
| rowspan= "2" | Afgan
| Most Popular Indonesian Artist
| 
|-
| Most Popular Regional Artist
| 
|-
| rowspan= "3" | 2012
| "Panah Asmara"
| Best Male Artist
| 
| rowspan= "3" |
|-
| rowspan= "4" | Afgan
| Most Popular Regional Artist
| 
|-
| New Media Icon
| 
|-
| rowspan= "4" | 2014
| APM Most Popular Artist
| 
| rowspan= "4" | 
|-
| Social Media Icon
| 
|-
| rowspan= "2" | "Katakan Tidak"
| Best Male Artist
| 
|-
| APM Most Popular Song
| 
|-
| rowspan= "3" | 2015
| "Kamu Yang Kutunggu" (feat. Rossa)
| Best Duo/Group
| 
| rowspan= "3" |
|-
| rowspan= "4" | Afgan
| Social Media Icon
| 
|-
| APM Most Popular Artist
| 
|-
| rowspan= "3" | 2016
| Social Media Icon
| 
| rowspan= "3" |
|-
| APM Most Popular Artist
| 
|-
| "Percayalah" (with Raisa)
| Best Duo/Group
| 
|-
| 2017
| "X" (feat. SonaOne)
| Best Collaboration (Artist)
| 
| 
|-

Asia Song Festival
The Asia Song Festival is an annual pop music festival held in South Korea that features artists from 10 Asian countries. Participating artists receive a plaque of appreciation from the Korean Ministry of Culture, Sports and Tourism and ‘Best Asian Artist Award’ from the chairman of Korea Foundation for International Culture and Exchange. This festival is recorded and broadcast by SBS (Korean freeTV), Fuji TV (Japanese freeTV/BS/CS), and 30 other broadcasters worldwide. Afgan has received one award.

!
|-
| 2014
| Afgan
| Best Asian Artist
| 
|
|-

Bright Awards
The Bright Awards are an annual awards were established in 2016, to honored for the artist of Indonesian television advertising. This awards show has teamed up with MNC Media and Unity of Indonesian Advertising Companies. Afgan has received one award.

!
|-
| 2017
| Afgan
| Favorite Male Star Advertisement
| 
| 
|-

Dahsyatnya Awards
First established in 2009, the Dahsyatnya Awards are an annual awards presented by the daily Indonesian TV show Dahsyat, to honour for musician who to be outstanding in music and entertainment. Afgan has received eight awards from 25 nominations.

!
|-
| 2009
| rowspan= "3" | Afgan
| rowspan= "3" | Outstanding Solo Singer
| 
|
|-
| 2010
| 
| 
|-
| rowspan= "3" | 2011
| 
| rowspan= "3" | 
|-
| rowspan= "2" | "Bawalah Cintaku"
| Outstanding Video Clip
| 
|-
| Outstanding Director Video Clip
| 
|-
| rowspan= "2" | 2012
| "Panah Asmara"
| Outstanding Song
| 
| rowspan= "2" | 
|-
| rowspan= "3" | Afgan
| rowspan= "3" | Outstanding Male Solo Singer
| 
|-
| 2013
| 
| 
|-
| rowspan= "2" | 2014
| 
| rowspan= "2" | 
|-
| "Jodoh Pasti Bertemu"
| rowspan= "2" | Outstanding Song
| 
|-
| rowspan= "4" | 2015
| "Katakan Tidak"
| 
| rowspan= "4" | 
|-
| rowspan= "2" | "Kumohon"
| Outstanding Video Clip
| 
|-
| Outstanding Director Video Clip
| 
|-
| rowspan= "2" | Afgan
| rowspan= "2" | Outstanding Male Solo Singer
| 
|-
| rowspan= "5" | 2016
| 
| rowspan= "5" | 
|-
| "Knock Me Out"
| rowspan= "2" | Outstanding Song
| 
|-
| "Kamulah Yang Kutunggu" (feat. Rossa)
| 
|-
| Afgan & Rossa
| rowspan= "2" | Outstanding Duet/Collaboration
| 
|-
| Afgan & Raisa
| 
|-
| rowspan= "3" | 2017
| "Kunci Hati"
| Outstanding Song
| 
| rowspan= "3" | 
|-
| "Jalan Terus"
| Outstanding Model Video Clip (with Lutesha)
| 
|-
| rowspan= "2" | Afgan
| rowspan= "2" | Outstanding Male Solo Singer
| 
|-
| rowspan= "3" | 2018
| 
| rowspan= "3" |
|-
| "X" (feat. SonaOne)
| Outstanding Duo/Collaboration
| 
|-
| "Ku Dengannya Kau Dengan Dia"
| Outstanding Video Clip
| 
|-

Global Seru Awards
The Global Seru Awards are awarded to celebrities who have caught the attention of the public through interesting or exciting accomplishments.

!
|-
| 2014
| "Jodoh Pasti Bertemu"
| Most Exciting Song
| 
|
|-

Grazia Glitz & Glam Awards
The Grazia Glitz & Glam Awards are an off-air awards ceremony were presented by magazine Grazia Indonesia, to honour for celebrity in fashion and entertainment. Afgan has received one award.

!
|-
| 2013
| "Jodoh Pasti Bertemu"
| Song of the Year
| 
| 
|-

Hai Reader's Poll Music Awards
Created by Indonesian magazine Hai, the Hai Reader's Poll Music Awards are an awards to honour for talent in music, based on online voting. Afgan has received two awards from 3 nominations.

!
|-
| 2012
| rowspan= "2" | Afgan
| rowspan= "2" | The Best Male
| 
| 
|-
| 2013
| 
|
|-
| 2015
| Konser Dari Hati
| The Best Concert
| 
|
|-

Inbox Awards
The Inbox Awards are an awards ceremony were presented by Indonesian TV program Inbox and SCTV for appreciated for talent in music and entertainment. It is first launched in 2008. Afgan has received two awards from 7 nominations.

!
|-
| 2010
| "Cinta 2 Hati" (with Olivia Jensen)
| Most Exciting Couple in Video Clip
| 
|
|-
| 2011
| rowspan= "6" | Afgan
| Most Inbox Solo Singer
| 
|
|-
| 2012
| rowspan= "5" | Most Inbox Male Solo Singer
| 
| 
|-
| 2013
| 
| 
|-
| 2014
| 
|
|-
| 2015
| 
|
|-
| 2016
| 
|
|-

Indigo Awards
The Indigo Awards are an annual award were presented by PT. Telekomunikasi Indonesia (Telkom) in 2009, to honour for artist, who have their song used most as ringback tones in all categories of creative industries and provide benefits for society, the environment, and create new business opportunities. Afgan has received two awards.

!
|-
| 2010
| rowspan= "2" | Afgan
| rowspan= "2" | Best Male Artist
| 
| 
|-
| 2011
| 
|
|-

Indonesian Box Office Movie Awards
Presented by SCTV since 2016, the Indonesian Box Office Movie Awards (shortly IBOMA) are an awards ceremony were honored for 10 films which regarded as the best-selling movie and earned a lot of viewers when aired in theaters.

!
|-
| 2017
| "Percayalah" (for London Love Story)
| Best Original Soundtrack
| 
|
|-

Indonesian Choice Awards
The Indonesian Choice Awards are an annual awards ceremony were established on 2014 by Indonesian television station, NET., to honour for talent artists whose had recognize for quality in music and entertainment.

!
|-
| rowspan= "2" | 2014
| Afgan
| Male Singer of the Year
| 
| rowspan= "2" |
|-
| L1ve to Love, Love to L1ve
| Album of the Year
| 
|-
| 2016
| "Percayalah" (with Raisa)
| Song of the Year
| 
|
|-

Indonesian Movie Awards
First established in 2007, the Indonesian Movie Awards (now Indonesian Movie Actor Awards) are an annual awards ceremony have presenting to filmmakers.

!
|-
| 2010
| "Bukan Cinta Biasa" (for film Bukan Cinta Biasa)
| rowspan= "3" | Favorite Soundtrack
| 
|
|-
| 2011
| "Dalam Mihrab Cinta" (for film Dalam Mihrab Cinta)
| 
|
|-
| 2014
| "Jodoh Pasti Bertemu" (for film Madre)
| 
|
|-

Indonesian Social Media Awards
The Indonesian Social Media Awards are an annual awards were established in 2016 by SCTV to appreciated for celebrity in social media.

!
|-
| rowspan= "2" | 2016
| rowspan= "2" | Afgan
| Male Celeb Facebook
| 
| rowspan= "2" | 
|-
| Male Celeb Twitter
| 
|-

Indonesian Television Awards
First established in 2016, the Indonesian Television Awards are awarded to honour a talented artist in entertainment and program television. Its awards show was based on social media voting, such as Twitter and Facebook.

!
|-
| 2016
| Afgan
| Most Popular Singer
| 
|
|-

Indosat Awards
The Indosat Awards are music awards presented by telecommunications provider Indosat, first presented in 2011. The awards are based on the popularity of a singer, as derived from sales, stage appearances, and radio chart positions. Afgan has received one award from 3 nominations.

!
|-
| rowspan= "3" | 2011
| Afgan
| Most Popular Male Pop Singer
| 
| rowspan= "3" | 
|-
| "Cinta Dua Hati"
| Most Popular Pop Song
| 
|-
| The One
| Most Popular Album
| 
|-

Infotainment Awards
Introduced in 2012, the Infotainment Awards are an awards ceremony were presented by SCTV for celebrities who had become hottest and with achievement in entertainment.

!
|-
| 2014
| Afgan
| Most Fashionable Male Celebrity
| 
|
|-

Insert Fashion Awards
First established in 2015, the Insert Fashion Awards are an awards ceremony have presenting to fashion designer and celebrity who had to be fashionable. Afgan has received one award.

!
|-
| 2017
| Afgan
| Top 3 Fashionable Male
| 
|
|-

Mom & Kids Awards
First launched in 2015 by MNC Group, the Mom & Kids Awards are awarded to talent artist who became as inspiration of mother and kids.

!
|-
| 2015
| rowspan= "2" | Afgan
| Favorite Male Singer
| 
|
|-
| 2016
| Favorite Idol Singer
| 
|
|-

JawaPos.com Readers Choice Awards
The JawaPos.com Readers Choice Awards was an online award first established in 2017 by newspaper Jawa Pos, to honour a public figure in music, film and entertainment.

!
|-
| 2017
| Afgan
| Favorite Male Singer
| 
|
|-

MTV Awards

MTV Ampuh

!
|-
| 2008
| rowspan= "2" | Afgan
| rowspan= "2" | Male Artist of the Year
| 
|
|-
| 2010
| 
|
|-

MTV Indonesia Awards
The MTV Indonesia Awards are an annual awards presented by MTV Indonesia, as chosen by their viewers throughout Indonesia. Afgan received two awards from 3 nominations.

!
|-
| rowspan= "2" | 2008
| rowspan= "2" | "Sadis"
| Most Favorite Male Artist
| 
| rowspan= "2" |
|-
| Best Artist of the Year
| 
|-
| 2009
| "Wajahmu Mengalirkan Duniaku"
| Most Favorite Male Artist
| 
|
|-

Nickelodeon Indonesia Kids' Choice Awards
The Nickelodeon Indonesia Kids' Choice Awards is Indonesian version of Nickelodeon Kids' Choice Awards, held since 2008 in Jakarta. Afgan received four awards from 10 nominations.

!
|-
| rowspan= "2" | 2008
| rowspan= "10" | Afgan
| Favorite Male Singer
| 
| rowspan= "2" | 
|-
| Indonesian Star Wannabe Award
| 
|-
| rowspan= "2" | 2009
| Favorite Male Singer
| 
| rowspan= "2" | 
|-
| Indonesian Star Wannabe Award
| 
|-
| 2010
| rowspan= "2" | Favorite Male Singer
| 
| 
|-
| 2011
| 
|
|-
| 2012
| rowspan= "4" | Favorite Singer
| 
|
|-
| 2014
| 
|
|-
| 2015
| 
|
|-
| 2017
| 
|
|-

Opera Van Java Awards
The OVJ Awards are an awards ceremony were presented by comedy program Opera Van Java and first established in 2011, to awarded for the main artist who has appeared as original cast and guest star.

!
|-
| 2013
| Afgan
| Most Tempted Artist
| 
|
|-

Oz Radio Bandung FM Awards
The Oz Radio Bandung FM Awards are an online radio awards were presented by OZ Radio FM, for talent musician/singer who have listed of 'friendly' in music. Afgan has received one award.

!
|-
| 2017
| rowspan= "2" | Afgan
| rowspan= "2" | Most Friendly Male Singer
| 
| 
|-
| 2018
| 
|
|-

SCTV Awards
First established in 2001, the SCTV Awards are an annual awards ceremony were presented by the Indonesian TV station SCTV, to honour for artists who became popular (Indonesian: Ngetop) in various programs. It is based on the audience's votes. Afgan has received three awards from 9 nominations.

!
|-
| 2008
| rowspan= "9" | Afgan
| rowspan= "9" | Famous Singer
| 
|
|-
| 2009
| 
| 
|-
| 2010
| 
| 
|-
| 2011
| 
|
|-
| 2012
| 
|
|-
| 2013
| 
|
|-
| 2014
| 
|
|-
| 2016
| 
| 
|-
| 2017
| 
|
|-

SCTV Music Awards
The SCTV Music Awards are a music awards ceremony were presented by Indonesian TV station, SCTV, to honour for artists who had to be popular (Indonesian: Paling Ngetop) in various songs and selling albums. It is based on the audience's vote. Afgan has received nine awards from 21 nominations.

!
|-
| rowspan= "3" | 2009
| rowspan= "2" | Confession No.1
| Famous Solo Pop Album
| 
| rowspan= "3" |
|-
| Famous Newcomer Album
| 
|-
| "Terima Kasih Cinta"
| Most Famous Song
| 
|-
| 2010
| Bukan Cinta Biasa (single)
| Famous Male Solo Album
| 
| 
|-
| rowspan= "2" | 2011
| The One
| Famous Solo Pop Album
| 
| rowspan= "2" | 
|-
| "Bawalah Cintaku"
| Most Famous Song
| 
|-
| 2012
| Kembali (single)
| Famous Male Solo Album
| 
| 
|-
| 2013
| rowspan= "2" | Afgan
| rowspan= "2" | Most Famous Male Solo Singer
| 
| 
|-
| rowspan= "2" | 2014
| 
| rowspan= "2" | 
|-
| "Jodoh Pasti Berlalu"
| Most Famous Pop Song
| 
|-
| 2015
| rowspan= "2" | Afgan
| rowspan= "2" | Most Famous Male Solo Singer
| 
| 
|-
| rowspan= "4" | 2016
| 
| rowspan= "4" | 
|-
| rowspan= "3" | "Percayalah" (with Raisa)
| Most Famous Video Clip
| 
|-
| Most Famous Pop Song
| 
|-
| rowspan= "2" | Most Famous Collaboration
| 
|-
| rowspan= "3" | 2017
| "Kamulah Yang Kutunggu" (with Rossa)
| 
| rowspan= "3" | 
|-
| "Jalan Terus"
| Most Famous Video Clip
| 
|-
| rowspan= "2" | Afgan
| rowspan= "2" | Most Famous Male Solo Singer
| 
|-
| rowspan= "3" | 2018
| 
| rowspan= "3" |
|-
| "Heaven" (feat. Isyana Sarasvati & Rendy Pandugo)
| Most Famous Collaboration
| 
|-
| "Ku Dengannya Kau Dengan Dia"
| Most Famous Video Clip
| 
|-

Seleb On News Awards
The Seleb On News Awards are awarding to honour for celebrities which to be important part from infotainment Seleb On News. It is a first launched in 2016.

!
|-
| 2016
| Afgan
| Most Quietest Celeb
| 
|
|-

Selebrita Awards
The Selebrita Awards are an awards ceremony were presented by infotainment program Selebrita on 2013, which recognize to artist in entertainment; and also voted by fans in website poll.

!
|-
| 2015
| "Knock Me Out"
| rowspan= "2" | Most Celeb Song
| 
|
|-
| 2016
| "Percayalah" (with Raisa)
| 
|
|-

Socmed Awards
The Socmed Awards are an awards for celebrities and public figures who dominated the popularity of various social media platforms, such as Instagram, YouTube, Blogs and Twitter.

!
|-
| 2016
| Afgan
| Celeb Twit Male
| 
|
|-

World Music Awards
The World Music Awards is an international awards show founded in 1989 under the patronage of Albert II, Prince of Monaco and based in Monte Carlo. Awards are presented to the world's best selling artist in various categories and to the best-selling artist from each major territory. Sales figures are provided by the International Federation of the Phonographic Industry. Afgan has received one award from 6 nominations.

!
|-
| rowspan= "6" | 2014
| rowspan= "2" | "Jodoh Pasti Bertemu"
| World's Best Song
| 
| rowspan= "6" | 
|-
| World's Best Video
| 
|-
| rowspan= "4" | Afgan
| World's Best Male Artist
| 
|-
| World's Best Live Act
| 
|-
| World's Best Entertainer of the Year
| 
|-
| World's Best Indonesian Male Artist (Voted)
| 
|-

Yahoo! Celebrity Awards
First established in 2012 (as Yahoo! OMG Awards) by Yahoo! Indonesia, the Yahoo! Celebrity Awards are an awards were giving to celebrity in film, music, radio and television, based on online voting in website.

!
|-
| 2014
| Afgan
| Most Stylist Male
| 
|
|-

Accolades from organizations

Anugerah Kekayaan Intelektual Nasional

!
|-
| 2014
| rowspan= "2" | Afgan
| Singer
| style="background: orange" align= "center" |Recipient
| 
|-
| 2015
| Medal for Creativity
| style="background: orange" align= "center" | Recipient
| 
|-

National Outstanding Youth Pioneer

!
|-
| 2014
| Afgan
| Field of Arts and Culture
| style="background: orange" align= "center" | Recipient
| 
|-

References

Afgan